"Unearthing Suite" is a short story by Margaret Atwood.

In 1983, it was published as a limited edition small press book and was included in her short story collection Bluebeard's Egg.

1983 short stories
Short stories by Margaret Atwood